Ashurst is a village and former civil parish five miles (8 km) west of Royal Tunbridge Wells in Kent, England, and is now in the parish of Speldhurst. The 10th-century parish church is dedicated to St Martin of Tours The parish is located on the border between Kent and East Sussex; the River Medway forms the border between the two counties. There were two watermills located here, both now closed, and there is a weir on the river. 


See also
Medway watermills

References

External links

Villages in Kent
Former civil parishes in Kent